Lakes Entrance is a seaside resort and fishing port in eastern Victoria, Australia. At the 2016 census, Lakes Entrance had a population of 4,810.

The township was originally named Cunninghame, the Post Office of that name opening on 5 February 1870. It was renamed Lakes Entrance on 1 January 1915.

Description
Lakes Entrance, which lies almost at sea level, can be reached from Melbourne via Bairnsdale and the town of Kalimna to the north-west by a stretch of the Princes Highway, which snakes down and around a point protruding into the Gippsland Lakes known as "Jemmy's Point". Views of The Entrance and of the Lakes can be seen from various look-outs on Jemmy's Point. The Princes Highway leaves the north-east side of the town through hilly countryside towards Nowa Nowa and Orbost. It has the largest number of inland waterways in the southern hemisphere. The ninety-mile beach is a big tourist attraction and the various national parks of Gippsland touch the coastline of Lakes Entrance. Two of the most scenic driving routes are also a part of this region, the Great Alpine Road and The Sydney to Melbourne Coastal Drive.    

Lakes Entrance is predominantly a fishing and tourism-driven town; the main beach front is a harbour for commercial fishing and recreational watersport operations. The surf beach is patrolled by the Lakes Entrance Surf Life Saving Club (SLSC) between November and March every summer, with lifeguard patrols from late December to late January. The waterfront is populated by the fishing fleet and two floating restaurants—Sodafish and The Floating Dragon Dockside Restaurant. The main street consists of shops, caravan parks, a Woolworths supermarket, a Target Country store that opened in 2007, a KFC and a McDonald's restaurant that opened in September 1997. The town's main residential areas lie farther inland.

Lakes Entrance has a number of camping and caravan parks, and free camping spots in Colquhoun State Forest.

Nearby major towns include Bairnsdale and Orbost.  Lakes Entrance falls within the Shire of East Gippsland.

Other towns include Swan Reach, Johnsonville, Kalimna, Nicholson, Metung and Lake Tyers.

Population
According to the 2016 census of Population, there were 4,810 people in Lakes Entrance.
 Aboriginal and Torres Strait Islander people made up 3.8% of the population. 
 75.9% of people were born in Australia. The next most common country of birth was England at 3.9%.   
 84.1% of people spoke only English at home. 
 The most common responses for religion were No Religion 32.5%, Catholic 20.6% and Anglican 15.9%.

Climate

Sports
The town has an Australian rules football team competing in the East Gippsland Football League.

The town is home to a hockey club in the East Gippsland Hockey Association, although the club still plays under the name of its original home town, Swan Reach.

Golfers play at the course of the Lakes Entrance Golf Club on Golf Links Road, which has 18 holes.

Gallery

See also
 The Lakes National Park

References

External links
 Official East Gippsland tourism website
 Official East Gippsland tourism Facebook page
 Lakes Entrance tourism Facebook page

Fishing communities in Australia
Ports and harbours of Victoria (Australia)
Towns in Victoria (Australia)
Shire of East Gippsland